Erawan National Park is a 343,735 rai ~  park in western Thailand in the Tenasserim Hills of Kanchanaburi Province, Amphoe Si Sawat in tambon Tha Kradan. Founded on August 14, 1975, it was Thailand's 12th national park.

Features
The major attraction of the park is Erawan Falls, a waterfall named after Erawan, the three-headed white elephant of Hindu mythology. The seven-tiered falls are said to resemble Erawan. There are four caves in the park: Mi, Rua, Wang Badan, and Phrathat. Rising northeast of the waterfall area there is a breast-shaped hill named Khao Nom Nang.

Flora 
Mixed deciduous forest accounts for 81.05% of the national park area. Deciduous dipterocarp forest accounts for 1.68% of the national park area. Dry evergreen forests account for 14.35% of the national park area.

Fauna
Mammals:

Birds:

Reptiles:

Amphibians:

Aquatic Animals:

See also
List of national parks of Thailand
List of Protected Areas Regional Offices of Thailand

References

Further reads 

 Notebook, BeautifulbEq. Notebook: Beautiful Waterfalls in the Erawan National Park in Tha , Journal for Writing, College Ruled Size 6 X 9 , 110 Pages. N.p., Independently Published, 2020.
 Atiyah, Jeremy. Southeast Asia. United Kingdom, Rough Guides, 2002.

External links

 National Park, Wildlife and Plant Conservation Department
Erawan National Park - attractions, species, maps
Attractions of Erawan
Erawan Waterfall
Get there
How to get from Bangkok to Kanchanaburi

National parks of Thailand
Waterfalls of Thailand
Protected areas established in 1975
Geography of Kanchanaburi province
Tourist attractions in Kanchanaburi province
1975 establishments in Thailand